Stigmella assimilella is a moth of the family Nepticulidae. It is found in most of Europe (except Ireland and the Balkan Peninsula), east through Russia to the eastern part of the Palearctic realm.

The larvae mine the leaves of their host plant, which typically includes species of aspen including Populus alba, Populus canescens and Populus tremula.

External links
bladmineerders.nl
Fauna Europaea

Nepticulidae
Moths of Europe
Moths of Asia
Moths described in 1848